Damaisiceras is an extinct monospecific ancylocerid genus included in the family Crioceratitidae, subclass Ammonoidea, from the Upper Hauterivian, zone of Balearites balearis. Fossils belonging to this genera were found southeastern France.

References

Fossils of France
Hauterivian life
Early Cretaceous ammonites of Europe